Princess Lalla Latifa Amahzoune;  – born in 1941 a member of the Zayane tribe (khenifra , Morocco), She is the widow of King Hassan II and the mother of Princess Lalla Meryem, King Mohammed VI, Princess Lalla Asma, Princess Lalla Hasna and Prince Moulay Rachid. She is referred to using terms such as "mother of the royal children". The privacy accorded to her in Morocco is so great that attempts to publish photos of her in the Moroccan newspaper Al Ayam were found to violate Moroccan law (in accord with a 1956 decree prohibiting publication of photos of the king and his family without authorization).

Life
Allegedly born Fatima Amahzoune, but called Latifa (to avoid confusion with her cousin, the king's alleged first wife, Lalla Fatima bint Qaid Ould Hassan Amhourak), she is of the Zayane Arab , related to Mouha ou Hammou Zayani, and niece of the Qaid Ould Hassan Amhourak. She married Hassan II on 9 November 1961 in a double ceremony with Lalla Lamia as-Solh the bride of Prince Moulay Abdallah of Morocco.

She is maternal half-sister to General Mohamed Medbouh (the latter's father being of the Gzennaya Riffian tribe), who was executed – along with 9 other high-ranking military officers – for having widely participated in the 1971 failed coup d'état attempt against Hassan II, which took place during the King's forty-second birthday party in his summer palace. The execution took place on 13 July 1971 and was broadcast live on state TV.

After the death of Hassan II, she remarried to Mohamed Mediouri, the bodyguard of the late Monarch and former security chief of the royal palace.

As of August 2022, she was ill and hospitalized in France, where she was visited by her son Mohammed VI.

References

Living people
1940s births
Moroccan royalty
Berber Moroccans
People from Khenifra
Princesses by marriage
Remarried royal consorts